History of Bingo may refer to:

 History of the American version of bingo, see 
 History of the British version of bingo, see